Brushy Creek Reservoir, now known as Brushy Lake, is a reservoir located eight miles northeast of Sallisaw, Oklahoma, on a tributary of Sallisaw Creek. Brushy Lake Park is located around the reservoir. Formerly known as Brushy Lake Reservoir and State Park, the area is now owned and operated by the city of Sallisaw.

General description
The lake was constructed in 1963 by the USDA Soil Conservation Service for flood control and a municipal water supply for Sallisaw. The total drainage area above the lake is 13,256 acres. Water is pumped to the Sallisaw treatment facilities via a 16-inch transmission line approximately six miles in length.

The lake covers 358 acres with a volume of 3258 acre-feet.

The City of Sallisaw completed a new water treatment plant in 2007, and retired two older, smaller plants. The project also including a new intake structure and pumping station.

Park amenities
The park has camping sites with electrical hookups, restrooms for campers using tents, a boat ramp and dock.

References

Bodies of water of Sequoyah County, Oklahoma
Reservoirs in Oklahoma
Dams completed in 1963